Van Antwerp is a surname. Notable people with the surname include:

Eugene Van Antwerp (1889–1962), American mayor
Robert L. Van Antwerp, Jr. (born 1950), United States Army general
Verplanck Van Antwerp (1807–1875), United States Union Army general

See also
Van Antwerp Building, skyscraper in Mobile, Alabama

Surnames of Dutch origin